Baudouin of Belgium (1930–1993) was King of the Belgians, 1951–1993.

Baudouin, a French masculine given name related to Baldwin, may also refer to:

Belgian royalty and nobility
 Prince Baudouin of Belgium (1869–1891), nephew of Leopold II
 Baudouin, 12th Prince of Ligne (1918–1985)

Others
 Baudouin des Auteus ( early 13th century), Picard trouvère
 Baudouin Michiels (born 1941), Belgian businessman
 Charles Baudouin (1893–1963), French-Swiss psychoanalyst
 Laurent Beaudoin (born 1938), Canadian businessman

See also
Baldwin (name), a surname
Boudewijn (given name)
Bedouin, a nomadic people of Southwest Asia and North Africa

French masculine given names